Beach Pajamas is a 1931 American Pre-Code comedy film directed by Fatty Arbuckle and released by RKO Radio Pictures.

Cast
 Addie McPhail
 Ena Gregory 
 Charlotte Mineau
 Vernon Dent
 James Finlayson
 Charles R. Moore
 Al Thompson

See also
 List of American films of 1931
 Fatty Arbuckle filmography

External links

1931 films
1931 comedy films
1931 short films
Films directed by Roscoe Arbuckle
American black-and-white films
RKO Pictures short films
Films with screenplays by Roscoe Arbuckle
American comedy short films
1930s English-language films
1930s American films